Laurence Brize (born 12 July 1976) is a French sports shooter. She competed at the 2004, 2008 and 2012 Summer Olympics.

At the 2004 Summer Olympics, she finished in 7th place in the 10m air rifle event and in joint 9th in the 50m rifle 3 positions event.  In 2008, competing in the same events at the Olympics she finished in 19th in the 10m air rifle and 13th in the 50m rifle 3 positions. At the 2012 Summer Olympics, she finished in 26th place in the 10m air rifle and 18th in the 50m rifle 3 positions.

References

External links
 

1976 births
Living people
French female sport shooters
Olympic shooters of France
Shooters at the 2004 Summer Olympics
Shooters at the 2008 Summer Olympics
Shooters at the 2012 Summer Olympics
Shooters at the 2016 Summer Olympics
People from Le Puy-en-Velay
Shooters at the 2015 European Games
European Games silver medalists for France
European Games medalists in shooting
Sportspeople from Haute-Loire
21st-century French women
20th-century French women